The family Asteraceae, alternatively Compositae, consists of over 32,000 known species of flowering plants in over 1,900 genera within the order Asterales. Commonly referred to as the aster, daisy, composite, or sunflower family, Compositae were first described in the year 1740. The number of species in Asteraceae is rivaled only by the Orchidaceae, and which is the larger family is unclear as the quantity of extant species in each family is unknown. 

Most species of Asteraceae are annual, biennial, or perennial herbaceous plants, but there are also shrubs, vines, and trees. The family has a widespread distribution, from subpolar to tropical regions, in a wide variety of habitats. Most occur in hot desert and cold or hot semi-desert climates, and they are found on every continent but Antarctica. The primary common characteristic is the existence of sometimes hundreds of tiny individual florets which are held together by protective involucres in flower heads, or more technically, capitula.

The oldest known fossils are pollen grains from the Late Cretaceous (Campanian to Maastrichtian) of Antarctica, dated to  million years ago (mya). It is estimated that the crown group of Asteraceae evolved at least 85.9 mya (Late Cretaceous, Santonian) with a stem node age of 88–89 mya (Late Cretaceous, Coniacian).

Asteraceae is an economically important family, providing food staples, garden plants, and herbal medicines. Species outside of their native ranges can be considered weedy or invasive.

Description
Members of the Asteraceae are mostly herbaceous plants, but some shrubs, vines, and trees (such as Lachanodes arborea) do exist. Asteraceae species are generally easy to distinguish from other plants because of their unique inflorescence and other shared characteristics, such as the joined anthers of the stamens. However, determining genera and species of some groups such as Hieracium is notoriously difficult (see "damned yellow composite" for example).

Roots
Members of the family Asteraceae generally produce taproots, but sometimes they possess fibrous root systems. Some species have underground stems in the form of caudices or rhizomes. These can be fleshy or woody depending on the species.

Stems
Stems are herbaceous, aerial, branched, and cylindrical with glandular hairs, generally erect, but can be prostrate to ascending. The stems can contain secretory canals with resin, or latex which is particularly common among the Cichorioideae.

Leaves
Leaves can be alternate, opposite, or whorled. They may be simple, but are often deeply lobed or otherwise incised, often conduplicate or revolute. The margins also can be entire or toothed. Resin or latex also can be present in the leaves.

Inflorescences

Nearly all Asteraceae bear their flowers in dense flower heads called capitula. They are surrounded by involucral bracts, and when viewed from a distance, each capitulum may appear to be a single flower. Enlarged outer (peripheral) flowers in the capitulum may resemble petals, and the involucral bracts may look like a calyx.

Floral heads 

In plants of the family Asteraceae, what appears to be a single flower is actually a cluster of much smaller flowers. The overall appearance of the cluster, as a single flower, functions in attracting pollinators in the same way as the structure of an individual flower in some other plant families. The older family name, Compositae, comes from the fact that what appears to be a single flower is actually a composite of smaller flowers.

The "petals" or "sunrays" in a sunflower head are actually individual strap-shaped flowers called ray flowers or ray florets, and the "sun disk" is made of smaller circular shaped individual flowers called disc flowers or disk florets. The word aster means "star" in Greek, referring to the appearance of some family members, as a star surrounded by rays. The cluster of flowers that may appear to be a single flower is called a head. The entire head may move tracking the sun, like a "smart" solar panel, which maximizes reflectivity of the whole unit and can thereby attract more pollinators.

On the outside the flower heads are small bracts that look like scales. These are called phyllaries, and together they form the involucre that protects the individual flowers in the head before they open. The individual heads have the smaller individual flowers (florets) arranged on a round or dome-like structure called the receptacle. The florets mature first at the outside, moving toward the center, with the youngest in the middle.

The individual flowers in a head have 5 fused petals (rarely 4), but instead of sepals, they have threadlike, hairy, or bristly structures singularly called a pappus, plural pappi, which surround the fruit and can stick to animal fur or be lifted by wind, aiding in seed dispersal. The whitish fluffy head of a dandelion, commonly blown on by children, is made of pappi with tiny seeds attached at the ends. The pappi provide a parachute like structure to help the seed be carried away in the wind.

A ray flower is a 3-tipped (3-lobed), strap-shaped, individual flower in the head of some members of the family Asteraceae. Sometimes a ray flower is 2-tipped (2-lobed). The corolla of the ray flower may have 2 tiny teeth opposite the 3-lobed strap, or tongue, indicating evolution by fusion from an originally 5-part corolla. Sometimes, the 3:2 arrangement is reversed, with 2 tips on the tongue, and 0 or 3 tiny teeth opposite the tongue. A ligulate flower is a 5-tipped, strap-shaped, individual flower in the heads of other members. A ligule is the strap-shaped tongue of the corolla of either a ray flower or of a ligulate flower. A disk flower (or disc flower) is a radially symmetric (i.e., with identical shaped petals arranged in circle around the center) individual flower in the head, which is ringed by ray flowers when both are present. Sometimes ray flowers may be slightly off from radial symmetry, or weakly bilaterally symmetric, as in the case of desert pincushions Chaenactis fremontii.

A radiate head has disc flowers surrounded by ray flowers. A ligulate head has all ligulate flowers. When a sunflower family flower head has only disc flowers that are sterile, male, or have both male and female parts, it is a discoid head. Disciform heads have only disc flowers, but may have two kinds (male flowers and female flowers) in one head, or may have different heads of two kinds (all male, or all female). Pistillate heads have all female flowers. Staminate heads have all male flowers. Sometimes, but rarely, the head contains only a single flower, or has a single flowered pistillate (female) head, and a multi-flowered male staminate (male) head.

Floral structures 

The distinguishing characteristic of Asteraceae is their inflorescence, a type of specialised, composite flower head or pseudanthium, technically called a calathium or capitulum, that may look superficially like a single flower. The capitulum is a contracted raceme composed of numerous individual sessile flowers, called florets, all sharing the same receptacle.

A set of bracts forms an involucre surrounding the base of the capitulum. These are called "phyllaries", or "involucral bracts". They may simulate the sepals of the pseudanthium. These are mostly herbaceous but can also be brightly coloured (e.g. Helichrysum) or have a scarious (dry and membranous) texture. The phyllaries can be free or fused, and arranged in one to many rows, overlapping like the tiles of a roof (imbricate) or not (this variation is important in identification of tribes and genera).

Each floret may be subtended by a bract, called a "palea" or "receptacular bract". These bracts are often called "chaff". The presence or absence of these bracts, their distribution on the receptacle, and their size and shape are all important diagnostic characteristics for genera and tribes.

The florets have five petals fused at the base to form a corolla tube and they may be either actinomorphic or zygomorphic. Disc florets are usually actinomorphic, with five petal lips on the rim of the corolla tube. The petal lips may be either very short, or long, in which case they form deeply lobed petals. The latter is the only kind of floret in the Carduoideae, while the first kind is more widespread. Ray florets are always highly zygomorphic and are characterised by the presence of a ligule, a strap-shaped structure on the edge of the corolla tube consisting of fused petals. In the Asteroideae and other minor subfamilies these are usually borne only on florets at the circumference of the capitulum and have a 3+2 scheme – above the fused corolla tube, three very long fused petals form the ligule, with the other two petals being inconspicuously small. The Cichorioideae has only ray florets, with a 5+0 scheme – all five petals form the ligule. A 4+1 scheme is found in the Barnadesioideae. The tip of the ligule is often divided into teeth, each one representing a petal. Some marginal florets may have no petals at all (filiform floret).

The calyx of the florets may be absent, but when present is always modified into a pappus of two or more teeth, scales or bristles and this is often involved in the dispersion of the seeds. As with the bracts, the nature of the pappus is an important diagnostic feature.

There are usually four or five stamens. The filaments are fused to the corolla, while the anthers are generally connate (syngenesious anthers), thus forming a sort of tube around the style (theca). They commonly have basal and/or apical appendages. Pollen is released inside the tube and is collected around the growing style, and then, as the style elongates, is pushed out of the tube (nüdelspritze).

The pistil consists of two connate carpels. The style has two lobes. Stigmatic tissue may be located in the interior surface or form two lateral lines. The ovary is inferior and has only one ovule, with basal placentation.

Fruits and seeds 
In members of the Asteraceae the fruit is achene-like, and is called a cypsela (plural cypselae). Although there are two fused carpels, there is only one locule, and only one seed per fruit is formed. It may sometimes be winged or spiny because the pappus, which is derived from calyx tissue often remains on the fruit (for example in dandelion). In some species, however, the pappus falls off (for example in Helianthus). Cypsela morphology is often used to help determine plant relationships at the genus and species level. The mature seeds usually have little endosperm or none.

Pollen 
The pollen of composites is typically echinolophate, a morphological term meaning "with elaborate systems of ridges and spines dispersed around and between the apertures."

Metabolites 
In Asteraceae, the energy store is generally in the form of inulin rather than starch. They produce iso/chlorogenic acid, sesquiterpene lactones, pentacyclic triterpene alcohols, various alkaloids, acetylenes (cyclic, aromatic, with vinyl end groups), tannins. They have terpenoid essential oils which never contain iridoids.

Asteraceae produce secondary metabolites, such as flavonoids and terpenoids. Some of these molecules can inhibit protozoan parasites such as Plasmodium, Trypanosoma, Leishmania and parasitic intestinal worms, and thus have potential in medicine.

Taxonomy

History
Compositae, the original name for Asteraceae, were first described in 1740 by Dutch botanist Adriaan van Royen. Traditionally, two subfamilies were recognised: Asteroideae (or Tubuliflorae) and Cichorioideae (or Liguliflorae). The latter has been shown to be extensively paraphyletic, and has now been divided into 12 subfamilies, but the former still stands. The study of this family is known as synantherology.

Phylogeny

The phylogenetic tree of subfamilies presented below is based on Panero & Funk (2002) updated in 2014, and now also includes the monotypic Famatinanthoideae.
The diamond (♦) denotes a very poorly supported node (<50% bootstrap support), the dot (•) a poorly supported node (<80%).

The family includes over 32,000 currently accepted species, in over 1,900 genera (list) in 13 subfamilies. The number of species in the family Asteraceae is rivaled only by Orchidaceae. Which is the larger family is unclear, because of the uncertainty about how many extant species each family includes. The four subfamilies Asteroideae, Cichorioideae, Carduoideae and Mutisioideae contain 99% of the species diversity of the whole family (approximately 70%, 14%, 11% and 3% respectively).

Because of the morphological complexity exhibited by this family, agreeing on generic circumscriptions has often been difficult for taxonomists. As a result, several of these genera have required multiple revisions.

Paleontology and evolutionary processes 
The oldest known fossils of members of Asteraceae are pollen grains from the Late Cretaceous of Antarctica, dated to ∼76–66 mya (Campanian to Maastrichtian) and assigned to the extant genus Dasyphyllum. Barreda, et al. (2015) estimated that the crown group of Asteraceae evolved at least 85.9 mya (Late Cretaceous, Santonian) with a stem node age of 88–89 mya (Late Cretaceous, Coniacian).

It is not known whether the precise cause of their great success was the development of the highly specialised capitulum, their ability to store energy as fructans (mainly inulin), which is an advantage in relatively dry zones, or some combination of these and possibly other factors. Heterocarpy, or the ability to produce different fruit morphs, has evolved and is common in Asteraceae. It allows seeds to be dispersed over varying distances and each is adapted to different environments, increasing chances of survival.

Etymology and pronunciation 
The name Asteraceae comes to international scientific vocabulary from New Latin, from  Aster, the type genus, + -aceae, a standardized suffix for plant family names in modern taxonomy. The genus name comes from the Classical Latin word , "star", which came from Ancient Greek , "star". It refers to the star-like form of the inflorescence. 

The original name Compositae is still valid under the International Code of Nomenclature for algae, fungi, and plants. It refers to the "composite" nature of the capitula, which consist of a few or many individual flowers.

The vernacular name daisy, widely applied to members of this family, is derived from the Old English name of the daisy (Bellis perennis): , meaning "day's eye". This is because the petals open at dawn and close at dusk.

Distribution and habitat 
Asteraceae species have a widespread distribution, from subpolar to tropical regions in a wide variety of habitats. Most occur in hot desert and cold or hot semi-desert climates, and they are found on every continent but Antarctica. They are especially numerous in tropical and subtropical regions (notably Central America, eastern Brazil, the Mediterranean, the Levant, southern Africa, central Asia, and southwestern China). The largest proportion of the species occur in the arid and semi-arid regions of subtropical and lower temperate latitudes. The Asteraceae family comprises 10% of all flowering plant species.

Ecology 

Asteraceae are especially common in open and dry environments. Many members of Asteraceae are pollinated by insects, which explains their value in attracting beneficial insects, but anemophily is also present (e.g. Ambrosia, Artemisia). There are many apomictic species in the family.

Seeds are ordinarily dispersed intact with the fruiting body, the cypsela. Anemochory (wind dispersal) is common, assisted by a hairy pappus. Epizoochory is another common method, in which the dispersal unit, a single cypsela (e.g. Bidens) or entire capitulum (e.g. Arctium) has hooks, spines or some structure to attach to the fur or plumage (or even clothes, as in the photo) of an animal just to fall off later far from its mother plant. 

Some members of Asteraceae are economically important as weeds. Notable in the United States are Senecio jacobaea (ragwort), Senecio vulgaris (groundsel), and Taraxacum (dandelion). Some are invasive species in particular regions, often having been introduced by human agency. Examples include various tumbleweeds, Bidens, ragweeds, thistles, and dandelion. Dandelion was introduced into North America by European settlers who used the young leaves as a salad green. A number of species are toxic to grazing animals.

Uses 

Asteraceae is an economically important family, providing products such as cooking oils, leaf vegetables like lettuce, sunflower seeds, artichokes, sweetening agents, coffee substitutes and herbal teas. Several genera are of horticultural importance, including pot marigold (Calendula officinalis), Echinacea (coneflowers), various daisies, fleabane, chrysanthemums, dahlias, zinnias, and heleniums. Asteraceae are important in herbal medicine, including Grindelia, yarrow, and many others.

Commercially important plants in Asteraceae include the food crops Lactuca sativa (lettuce), Cichorium (chicory), Cynara scolymus (globe artichoke), Helianthus annuus (sunflower), Smallanthus sonchifolius (yacón), Carthamus tinctorius (safflower) and Helianthus tuberosus (Jerusalem artichoke).

Plants are used as herbs and in herbal teas and other beverages. Chamomile, for example, comes from two different species: the annual Matricaria chamomilla (German chamomile) and the perennial Chamaemelum nobile (Roman chamomile). Calendula (known as pot marigold) is grown commercially for herbal teas and potpourri. Echinacea is used as a medicinal tea. The wormwood genus Artemisia includes absinthe (A. absinthium) and tarragon (A. dracunculus). Winter tarragon (Tagetes lucida), is commonly grown and used as a tarragon substitute in climates where tarragon will not survive.

Many members of the family are grown as ornamental plants for their flowers, and some are important ornamental crops for the cut flower industry. Some examples are Chrysanthemum, Gerbera, Calendula, Dendranthema, Argyranthemum, Dahlia, Tagetes, Zinnia, and many others.

Many species of this family possess medicinal properties and are used as traditional antiparasitic medicine.

Members of the family are also commonly featured in medical and phytochemical journals because the sesquiterpene lactone compounds contained within them are an important cause of allergic contact dermatitis. Allergy to these compounds is the leading cause of allergic contact dermatitis in florists in the US. Pollen from ragweed Ambrosia is among the main causes of so-called hay fever in the United States.

Asteraceae are also used for some industrial purposes. French Marigold (Tagetes patula) is common in commercial poultry feeds and its oil is extracted for uses in cola and the cigarette industry. The genera Chrysanthemum, Pulicaria, Tagetes, and Tanacetum contain species with useful insecticidal properties. Parthenium argentatum (guayule) is a source of hypoallergenic latex.

Several members of the family are copious nectar producers and are useful for evaluating pollinator populations during their bloom. Centaurea (knapweed), Helianthus annuus (domestic sunflower), and some species of Solidago (goldenrod) are major "honey plants" for beekeepers. Solidago produces relatively high protein pollen, which helps honey bees over winter.

References

Bibliography

External links 

 Asteraceae at the Angiosperm Phylogeny Website
 Compositae.org – Compositae Working Group (CWG) and Global Compositae Database (GCD)

 
Asterales families
Extant Campanian first appearances